Kimberly "Kim" Dawn Masland (born 1970) is a Canadian politician. She was elected to the Nova Scotia House of Assembly in the 2017 provincial election. A member of the Progressive Conservative Association of Nova Scotia, she represents the electoral district of Queens-Shelburne.

Early life and education
Masland graduated from North Queens Community School in 1988. She then graduated from Halifax Business Academy with a diploma in business administration.

Career
Prior to her election to the House of Assembly, Masland served as chief of staff for former Member of Parliament Gerald Keddy. She previously worked with the Royal Bank of Canada in Liverpool for eight years in personal banking.

On August 31, 2021, Masland was made Minister of Public Works.

Electoral record

References

Canadian bankers
Dalhousie University alumni
Living people
Political chiefs of staff
Progressive Conservative Association of Nova Scotia MLAs
Members of the Executive Council of Nova Scotia
Royal Bank of Canada people
Women MLAs in Nova Scotia
21st-century Canadian politicians
21st-century Canadian women politicians
1970 births